The Yannan Academy is a former tutorial academy in Jincheng Township, Kinmen County, Taiwan.

History
In 2012, the academy underwent renovation to make it as a 回-shaped building.

Architecture
The front hall of the academy is dedicated to Qingshui Anchester God and the back hall is dedicated to gods related to study and exams. The rooms on the left and right wings are the exhibition and activity space. In the courtyard, lies a giant scroll shaped art.

See also
 List of tourist attractions in Taiwan

References

Academies in Taiwan
Buildings and structures in Kinmen County
Jincheng Township
Tourist attractions in Kinmen County